Ricardo Agustín Chopitea Trujillo (born 10 February 1999) is a Uruguayan footballer who plays as a defender for River Plate in the Uruguayan Primera División.

References

External links
Profile at Sofa Score

1999 births
Living people
C.A. Cerro players
Club Atlético River Plate (Montevideo) players
Uruguayan Segunda División players
Uruguayan footballers
Association football defenders